Mary Marsden Young (June 21, 1879 – June 23, 1971) was an American stage and film actress whose career spanned the first sixty years of the 20th century. She started her career in the theatre and ended playing elderly ladies in film and lastly on television.

Her first Broadway credit was in 1899. On stage she scored a memorable hit in 1913 playing opposite John Barrymore in the stage version of Believe Me, Xantippe. 1924 saw her on Broadway in Dancing Mothers opposite John Halliday and Helen Hayes who played the daughter later made famous by Clara Bow in a silent film. She was approaching 60 in 1937 when she made her first Hollywood movie. She made many television appearances in the 1950s and 1960s. Her last television appearance was in a 1968 episode of Gomer Pyle.

She and her husband, actor John Craig, had two children, the eldest of whom, Harmon Bushnell Craig, was killed at 22 while serving in World War I. Their other son, John Craig Jr., died in Los Angeles in 1945. Mary Young died at La Jolla, California, on June 23, 1971, aged 92.

Selected filmography

 The Angel of Crooked Street (1922) - Mrs. Marsh
After Marriage (1925) - Mrs. James Morgan
 This Is My Affair (1937) - Dowager
 The Hound of the Baskervilles (1939) - Betsy Ann's Mother (uncredited)
 The Women (1939) - Grandma (uncredited)
 Foreign Correspondent (1940) - Auntie Maude (uncredited)
 The Wife Takes a Flyer (1942) - Old Lady (uncredited)
 Blondie for Victory (1942) - Mrs. Webster, Housewife of America (uncredited)
 The Navy Comes Through (1942) - Mrs. Duttson (uncredited)
 Watch on the Rhine (1943) - Mrs. Mellie Sewell
 Address Unknown (1944) - Mrs. Delaney
 Casanova Brown (1944) - Mrs. Dean (uncredited)
 The Lost Weekend (1945) - Mrs. Deveridge
 The Stork Club (1945) - Mrs. Edith Bates
 Shock (1946) - Mrs. Penny (uncredited)
 To Each His Own (1946) - Mrs. Nix
 The Bride Wore Boots (1946) - Janet Doughton
 Temptation (1946) - Mrs. McCormick (uncredited)
 Blondie's Holiday (1947) - Mrs. Breckenbridge
 A Likely Story (1947) - Little Old Lady
 A Double Life (1947) - Actress in 'A Gentleman's Gentleman'
 Song of Surrender (1949) - Miss Rivercomb (uncredited)
 One Too Many (1950) - Mrs. Sullivan
 The Mating Season (1951) - Spinster
 The Fat Man (1951) - Saleswoman (uncredited)
 An American in Paris (1951) - Flower Lady (uncredited)
 Joe Palooka in Triple Cross (1951) - Mrs. Reed, Tourist Stop Manager
 Walk East on Beacon (1952) - Old Lady (uncredited)
 It Should Happen to You (1954) - Elderly Customer at Macy's (uncredited)
 A Star Is Born (1954) - Boardinghouse Woman (uncredited)
 This Is My Love (1954) - Mrs. Timberly
 The Seven Year Itch (1955) - Woman in Train Station (uncredited)
 Around the World in Eighty Days (1956) - Extra (uncredited)
 Official Detective (1958, Episode: "The Silk Stocking Gang") - Mrs. Claudia Montgomery 
 Alias Jesse James (1959) - 'Ma' James
 Blue Denim (1959) - Aunt Bidda
 The Trouble with Angels (1966) - Mrs. Eldridge
 Dead Heat on a Merry-Go-Round (1966) - Mrs. Galbrace (uncredited)

References

External links

 
Portraits (NY Public Library, Billy Rose collection), digitalcollections.nypl.org

1879 births
1971 deaths
Actresses from New York City
American stage actresses
American film actresses
20th-century American actresses